Central South was a planned MTR station on the Sha Tin to Central Link. If it was constructed, the station would have served as the southern terminus of the North South Corridor. In the 2012 and 2013 MTR annual reports, Central South station was still marked on the Future Stations and Network Map.

History
When KCRC submitted its first proposal on the new line, the station was named Central West, and had a site to the west of the one in the current proposal.

In 2004, KCRC submitted a new proposal, which pointed out that there are technical problems on the original planned location of the station, due to the soft soil found there. The proposal suggested an option of placing the station somewhere south of Upper Albert Road.

In 2008, the Government announced that it was considering the proposal that MTR had recently submitted, in which Central South station will be cancelled. The Government had promised that the details of the final plan will be revealed in early February.

On 11 March 2008, a new proposal of the project was announced, in which Central South station will not be built during the meantime as a better site has yet to be found.

References

Central, Hong Kong
Proposed railway stations in Hong Kong